Maneyevo (Mänew) is a rural locality (a selo) in Meselinsky Selsoviet, Aurgazinsky District, Bashkortostan, Russia. The population was 360 as of 2010. There are 8 streets.

Geography 
Maneyevo is located 32 km south of Tolbazy (the district's administrative centre) by road. Meseli is the nearest rural locality.

References 

Rural localities in Aurgazinsky District